Otha is a given name and surname. Notable persons with that name include:

Persons with the given name
Otha Bailey (1931–2013), American baseball player
Ellas Otha Bates or Bo Diddley (1928–2008), American singer, songwriter, guitarist, and producer
Otha Turner (1907–2003), American musician
Otha Wearin (1903–1990), American writer and politician
Otha Young (1943–2009), American singer, songwriter, guitarist, and producer

Persons with the family name
Patrice Otha, Gabonese politician

See also
Dotha
Othaya
Othe
Otho
Otta (disambiguation)
Utha
Watha (disambiguation)